Rubén Santiago Garcés Riquelme (born October 17, 1973) is a Panamanian professional basketball player. He last played for the Mets de Guaynabo of Puerto Rico. A 6'9" power forward/center, he played US college basketball with Navarro Junior College in Texas, and with Providence College in Rhode Island, and had a brief career in the NBA in the 2000-01 season, playing with Phoenix and Golden State. He has also played in the American CBA, the Spanish ACB, in Argentina, Venezuela, and France.

Career statistics

Domestic leagues

References

External links
NBA Stats @ basketballreference.com
Profile @ ACB.com
Basketpedya.com Profile

1973 births
Living people
Algodoneros de la Comarca players
ASVEL Basket players
CB Breogán players
CB Estudiantes players
CB Valladolid players
Centers (basketball)
Panamanian expatriate basketball people in the United States
Golden State Warriors players
Navarro Bulldogs basketball players
La Crosse Bobcats players
Liga ACB players
National Basketball Association players from Panama
Panamanian expatriate basketball people in Mexico
Panamanian expatriate basketball people in Spain
Panamanian people of Spanish descent
Phoenix Suns players
Power forwards (basketball)
Providence Friars men's basketball players
Quad City Thunder players
Soles de Mexicali players
Spanish men's basketball players
Sportspeople from Colón, Panama
Undrafted National Basketball Association players
Valencia Basket players
2006 FIBA World Championship players